Damian Conway (born 5 October 1964 in Melbourne, Australia) is a computer scientist, a member of the Perl and Raku communities, a public speaker, and the author of several books. Until 2010, he was also an adjunct associate professor in the Faculty of Information Technology at Monash University.

Damian completed his BSc (with honours) and PhD at Monash. He is perhaps best known for his contributions to Comprehensive Perl Archive Network (CPAN) and Raku (Perl 6) language design, and his training courses, both on programming techniques and public speaking skills.

He has won the Larry Wall Award three times for CPAN contributions. His involvement in Perl 6 language design has been as an interlocutor and explicator of Larry Wall.

He is one of the authors of the Significantly Prettier and Easier C++ Syntax (SPEC).

Books
 Object Oriented Perl: A Comprehensive Guide to Concepts and Programming Techniques (Manning Publications, 2000)
 Perl Best Practices (O'Reilly Media, 2005)
 (with "chromatic" and Curtis "Ovid" Poe) Perl Hacks: Tips & Tools for Programming, Debugging, and Surviving (Hacks) (O'Reilly Media, 2006)

References

External links

Damian Conway's homepage
Damian Conway's old homepage at Monash
meta::cpan modules authored by Damian Conway
Interview on CodingByNumbers podcast
Interview on How I Vim

1964 births
Living people
Australian computer scientists
Perl writers
Australian technology writers
Computer science educators
Monash University alumni
Academic staff of Monash University
Free software programmers
Scientists from Melbourne